Amphelikturus dendriticus, the pipehorse, is a species of pygmy pipehorse native to the western Atlantic Ocean.  This small, highly camouflaged pipefish is rarely seen.  This species grows to a length of  TL.  This species is the only known member of its genus.

References

External links
 

Syngnathidae
Taxa named by Thomas Barbour
Fish described in 1905